The 2011–12 Utah State Aggies men's basketball team represented Utah State University in the 2011–12 college basketball season. This was head coach Stew Morrill's fourteenth season at Utah State. The Aggies played their home games at the Smith Spectrum and are members of the Western Athletic Conference. They finished the season 21–16, 8–6 in WAC play to finish in fourth place. They lost in the quarterfinals of the WAC Basketball tournament to Louisiana Tech. They were invited to the 2012 CollegeInsider.com Tournament where they defeated Cal State Bakersfield, Idaho, Loyola Marymount and Oakland to advance to the championship game where they fell to Mercer.

Roster

Schedule
 

|-
!colspan=9| Exhibition

|-
!colspan=9| Regular season

|-
!colspan=9| WAC tournament

|-
!colspan=9| 2012 CollegeInsider.com Postseason Tournament

References 

Utah State Aggies
Utah State Aggies men's basketball seasons
Utah State
Aggies
Aggies